Queta Claver (June 24, 1929 – May 3, 2003) was a Spanish actress, singer, and dancer, known for her "vedette" roles in stage revues.

Early life
Enriqueta Claver Delás was born in València, Spain in 1929 (some sources give 1932). Her mother was actress Enriqueta Delás. Claver attended the Conservatorio de València.

Career
Films featuring Queta Claver included La bella Mimí (1960), El vikingo (1972), Tamaño natural (1974), Los buenos días perdidos (1975),  Los placeres ocultos (1977), El sacerdote (1978), El diputado (1978), La colmena (1982), El pico (1983), Tiempo de silencio (1986), Voyage to Nowhere (1986), Colegas (1987) Montoyos y Tarantos (1989), and Beltenebros (1991).

Claver also appeared in plays and especially in revues, beginning with Un crimen vulgar (1950). She was also seen in Moreno tiene que ser, Doña Mariquita de mi corazón, ¡Cinco minutos nada menos!, A vivir del cuento, Ana María, La chacha, Rodríguez y su padre, Una jovencita de 800 años, Metidos en Harina, Tres eran tres... ¡los novios de Elena!, Un millón de dolares, ¡Ay, qué ladronas!. She specialized in "vedette" roles in the revue. 

Her television roles came in such series as Suspiros de España (1974), Juanita, la Larga (1982), Goya (1982), Clase media (1987), Compuesta y sin novio (1994), Ada Madrina (1999) and Nada es para siempre (2000).

She won the Valladolid gold medal for her work in El sueño de la razón. She also won two acting prizes from the National Syndicate of Spectacle, in 1972 (best supporting actress) and 1975 (best actress).

Personal life
Queta Claver married dancer Paco Alba, but they were separated at the time of her death. She died in 2003, in Madrid age 73 years, from coronary disease.

References

External links
 
 Queta Claver on BFI.
 Queta Claver memorial on Find a Grave.
 Juan José Montijano Ruiz, Queta Claver “…y no te olvides nunca, de Ana María…” (Circulo Rojo Editorial 2015).  (A recent biography.)
 A 1978 photograph of Queta Claver, at Getty Images.

1929 births
2003 deaths
Spanish actresses